is a dam in Kitagawa, Kōchi Prefecture, Japan. It is located on the Nahari River downstream from Yanase Dam and Kuki Dam.

References 

Dams in Kōchi Prefecture
Dams completed in 1970